John Paschal (died 1361) was a 14th-century English bishop. Paschal, native of Suffolk, became a Carmelite friar at Ipswich. Paschal was sent to study at Cambridge University. John Paschal in 1347 was nominated bishop of Llandaff. He died on 11 October 1361.

References

13th-century births
1361 deaths
Carmelites
Bishops of Llandaff
Clergy from Ipswich
14th-century English Roman Catholic bishops